The 1939 Utah Utes football team was an American football team that represented the University of Utah as a member of the Mountain States Conference (MSC) during the 1939 college football season. In their 15th season under head coach Ike Armstrong, the Utes compiled an overall record of 6–1–2 with a mark of 4–1–1 in conference play, placed second in the MSC, and outscored all opponents by a total of 261 to 74.

Four Utah players received recognition on the 1939 All-Mountain States football team: end Paul Bogden; tackle Luke Pappas; guard Rex Geary; and quarterback Bill Swan.

Schedule

After the season

NFL Draft
Utah had three players selected in the 1940 NFL Draft.

In addition, Halfback Fred Gehrke was not drafted but played eight seasons in the National Football League (NFL).

References

Utah
Utah Utes football seasons
Utah Utes football